Glutathione amide reductase (GAR) is an enzyme with systematic name glutathione amide:NAD+ oxidoreductase. This enzyme catalyses the following chemical reaction

 2 glutathione amide + NAD+  glutathione amide disulfide + NADH + H+

Glutathione amide reductase is a dimeric flavoprotein (FAD).

References

External links 
 

EC 1.8.1